The bilateral relations between the Himalayan Kingdom of Bhutan and the Republic of India have been traditionally close and both countries share a "special relationship", making Bhutan a protected state, but not a protectorate, of India. India remains influential over Bhutan's foreign policy, defence and commerce. Bhutan is the largest beneficiary of India's foreign aid.

Background
For much of its history, Bhutan has preserved its isolation from the outside world, staying out of international organizations and maintaining few bilateral relations. Bhutan became a protectorate of British India after signing a treaty in 1910 allowing the British to "guide" its foreign affairs and defence. Bhutan was one of the first to recognize India's independence in 1947 and both nations fostered close relations, their importance augmented by the annexation of Tibet in 1950 by the People's Republic of China and its border disputes with both Bhutan and India, which saw close ties with Bhutan and Nepal to be central to its "Himalayan frontier" security policy. India shares a  border with Bhutan and is its largest trading partner, accounting for 98 percent of its exports and 90 percent of its imports.

Military cooperation
A 2,000 strong Indian Military Training Team (IMTRAT) is permanently based in western Bhutan to train the Royal Bhutan Army, while other units regularly cooperate with the Royal Bhutan Army.

1949 treaty
On August 9, 1949, Bhutan and India signed the Treaty of Friendship, calling for peace between the two nations and non-interference in each other's internal affairs. However, Bhutan agreed to let India "guide" its foreign policy and both countries would consult each other closely on foreign and defence affairs. The treaty also established free trade and extradition protocols. Scholars regard the effect of the treaty is to make Bhutan into a protected state, but not a protectorate, because Bhutan continues to have the power to conduct its own foreign policy.

The annexation of Tibet by Communist China brought both countries even closer. In 1958, the then-Indian Prime Minister Jawaharlal Nehru visited Bhutan and reiterated India's support for Bhutan's independence and later declared in the Indian Parliament that any aggression against Bhutan would be seen as aggression against India.

In August 1959, there was a rumour in India political circle that China was seeking to "liberate" Bhutan and Sikkim. Nehru stated in the Lok Sabha that the defence of the territorial uprightness and frontiers of Bhutan was the responsibility of the Government of India.

The period saw a major increase in India's economic, military and development aid to Bhutan, which had also embarked on a programme of modernisation to bolster its security. While India repeatedly reiterated its military support to Bhutan, the latter expressed concerns about India's ability to protect Bhutan against China while fighting a two-front war involving Pakistan. Despite good relations, India and Bhutan did not complete a detailed demarcation of their borders until the period between 1973 and 1984. Border demarcation talks with India generally resolved disagreements except for several small sectors, including the middle zone between Sarpang and Geylegphug and the eastern frontier with the Indian state of Arunachal Pradesh.

Indo-Bhutanese relations since 1972

Although relations remained close and friendly, the Bhutanese government expressed a need to renegotiate parts of the treaty to enhance Bhutan's sovereignty. Bhutan began to slowly assert an independent attitude in foreign affairs by joining the United Nations in 1971, recognizing Bangladesh and signing a new trade agreement in 1972 that provided an exemption from export duties for goods from Bhutan to third countries. Bhutan exerted its independent stance at the Non-Aligned Movement (NAM) summit conference in Havana, Cuba also in 1979, by voting with China and some Southeast Asian countries rather than with India on the issue of allowing Cambodia's Khmer Rouge to be seated at the conference. Unlike in Nepal, where its 1950 treaty with India has been the subject of great political controversy and nationalist resentment because of Indian immigrants in Nepal, the nature of Bhutan's relationship with India has not been affected by concerns over the treaty provisions. From 2003 to 2004, the Royal Bhutan Army conducted operations against anti-India insurgents of the United Liberation Front of Assam (ULFA) that were operating bases in Bhutan and using its territory to carry out attacks on Indian soil.

2007 treaty
India re-negotiated the 1949 treaty with Bhutan and signed a new treaty of friendship in 2007. The new treaty replaced the provision requiring Bhutan to take India's guidance on foreign policy with broader sovereignty and  not require Bhutan to obtain India's permission over arms imports. In 2008, India's then Prime Minister Dr. Manmohan Singh visited Bhutan and expressed strong support for Bhutan's move towards democracy. India allows 16 entry and exit points for Bhutanese trade with other countries (the only exception being China) and has agreed to develop and import a minimum of 10,000 megawatts of electricity from Bhutan by 2021.

Support 
In 2012–13 fiscal, India's budgetary support to the Kingdom country stood at US$600 million (around ₹30 billion). It steadily rose over the years to reach US$985 million (₹61.60 billion) in 2015–16 making Bhutan the largest beneficiary of India's foreign aid.

Bhutan's Prime Minister, Tshering Tobgay, requested an additional aid package from India worth INR 54 billion (USD 819 million, as per the exchange rates at the time of signing the deal) for his nation during his visit to New Delhi in August 2013. Five-sixths of this amount (INR 45 billion) has been earmarked for Bhutan's 11th Five-Year plan. INR 4 billion was for the pending projects of the previous plan period. The remaining INR 5 billion was part of India's "Economic stimulus package" for Bhutan's slowing economy.

India operates three hydro power projects, of 1,416 MW in Bhutan and three more of 2,129 MW are under construction. The third Prime Minister of Bhutan Lotay Tshering secured an aid package of about Nu.45 billion (about $635 million) for the 12th five-year plan in his first overseas visit to India in November 2018. During this meeting the tariff rate for the Mangdechhu Hydropower Project plant was also brought under discussion where Lotay Tshering tried to raise the rate to Nu.4.27 but it ended more towards the Indian Government's negotiation price of Nu.4.1. The revised tariff rate for the plant was then settled at Nu.4.12. The government of Bhutan also received Nu.4Billion for trade facilitation and boosting economic linkages.

In 21st century

Indian Prime Minister Narendra Modi chose Bhutan as his first foreign destination. Modi inaugurated the Supreme Court Complex in Bhutan and also promised help to Bhutan on the IT and digital sectors.

This visit followed an invitation by King Jigme Khesar Namgyel Wangchuck and Tobgay. The visit was called by the media as a "charm offensive" that would also seek to check Bhutan-China relations that had recently been formalized. He also sought to build business ties, including a hydro-electric deal, and inaugurated the India-funded Supreme Court of Bhutan building. While talking about the visit, Modi said that Bhutan was a "natural choice" for his first foreign destination because of the "unique and special relationship" the two countries shared. He added that he was looking forward to nurture and further strengthen India's special relations with Bhutan. His entourage included Foreign Minister Sushma Swaraj, National Security Adviser Ajit Doval and Foreign Secretary Sujatha Singh. He was further set to discuss the insurgency in Northeast India, and China.

See also

 Bhutan House
 Foreign relations of Bhutan
 Foreign relations of India
 South Asian Association for Regional Cooperation (SAARC)

References

Further reading
 

 
India
Bilateral relations of India